In linguistics, an oxytone (from the , , 'sharp-sounding') is a word with the stress on the last syllable, such as the English words correct and reward. 

It contrasts with a paroxytone, stressed on the penultimate (second-last) syllable, and a proparoxytone, stressed on the antepenultimate (third-last) syllable.

See also
Barytone
Paroxytone
Penult
Perispomenon
Preantepenult
Proparoxytone
Properispomenon
Ultima (linguistics)
Stress (linguistics)

Phonology
Ancient Greek
Stress (linguistics)